WUMY (830 kHz) is a commercial AM radio station broadcasting a Spanish language Christian radio format.  It is licensed to Memphis, Tennessee, and is owned by the Ministry Outreach Foundation, through licensee MOF-Christian Media I, LLC.

WUMY is a daytimer, powered at 3,000 watts non-directional.  It broadcasts on the clear channel frequency of 830 AM, reserved for Class A WCCO Minneapolis.  To avoid interference, WUMY must sign off at night.  Programming is heard around the clock on 250 watt FM translator W288BJ at 105.5 MHz.

History
On , the station first signed on the air. It was originally licensed to Kennett, Missouri, and had the call sign KBOA.  In 2014, it took the call letters WGUE.

On November 30, 2017, WGUE swapped call letters with sister station WUMY.  WGUE is now heard on 1180 AM and WUMY moved to 830 AM.

Effective October 1, 2018, the station was sold to MOF-Christian Media, along with translator 105.5 W288BJ, for $706,823.  It adopted a Spanish language Christian format.

Translator
WUMY can also be heard at 105.5 MHz, through an FM translator.

References

External links

FCC History Cards for WUMY

UMY
1947 establishments in Missouri
Radio stations established in 1947
UMY
UMY